Rohtak–Rewari DEMU is a passenger train of the Indian Railways which runs between Rohtak Junction railway station of Haryana and Rewari Junction railway station of Haryana. This train is India's first CNG train which was flagged off on 14 January 2015, by Union Minister for Railways Suresh Prabhu.

Arrival and departure

 Train no.74018 departs from Rohtak Junction, daily at 05:00, reaching Rewari the same day at 07:00.
 Train no.74015 departs from Rewari daily at 07:10, from platform no.1 reaching Rohtak Junction the same day at 09:25.

Route and halts

The train goes via . The important halts of the train are:

 Rohtak Junction railway station
 Asthal Bohar Junction railway station
 Dighal railway station
 Jhajjar railway station
 Machhrauli railway station
 Palhawas railway station
 Gokalgarh railway station
 Rewari Junction railway station

Average speed and frequency

The train runs with an average speed of 40 km/h and completes 81 km in 2h. The train runs on daily basis.

References

External links 

 Rohtak–Rewari DEMU

Transport in Haryana
Railway services introduced in 2015
Rail transport in Haryana
Diesel–electric multiple units of India